Trapped is a 2012 urban fantasy novel by Kevin Hearne and is the fifth book in his Iron Druid Chronicles series.

Plot
After twelve years of secret training, Atticus O’Sullivan is finally ready to bind his apprentice, Granuaile, to the earth and double the number of Druids in the world. But on the eve of the ritual, the world that thought he was dead abruptly discovers that he’s still alive, and they would much rather he return to the grave. Having no other choice, Atticus, his trusted Irish wolfhound, Oberon, and Granuaile travel to the base of Mount Olympus, where the Roman god Bacchus is anxious to take his sworn revenge—but he’ll have to get in line behind an ancient vampire, a band of dark elves, and an old god of mischief, who all seem to have KILL THE DRUID at the top of their to-do lists.

Characters
 Atticus O'Sullivan: The last of the Druids.
 Oberon: Atticus's Irish Wolfhound; he can communicate telepathically with Atticus.
 Granuaile: Atticus' Druid initiate.
 Perun: Slavic God of Thunder.
 The Morrígan: Celtic Chooser of the Slain and goddess of art.
 Hallbjörn “Hal” Hauk: Alpha leader of the Tempe, Arizona werewolf pack.
 Leif Helgarson:  Atticus's former nighttime lawyer, a vampire.

2012 American novels
Urban fantasy novels
Novels set in Arizona
Del Rey books